Geoff Pierson is an American actor known for his starring television roles on Dexter, Unhappily Ever After, Grace Under Fire, 24, Ryan's Hope, and Designated Survivor. He has guest-starred in dozens of other TV shows.

Career
Pierson appeared with George C. Scott on Broadway in Tricks Of The Trade, before continuing on to do several New York soap operas and many regional theater plays. Some notable theatrical roles include Angelo in Measure For Measure at the Yale Rep, Stanley in A Streetcar Named Desire at the Penn Ctr. Stage, Bobby in Speed The Plough at the Philadelphia Theatre Company, and Ricky in Glengarry Glen Ross and Teach in American Buffalo at the Virginia Stage Company. His most prominent daytime role was as Frank Ryan on Ryan's Hope, a role he played from February 1983 through September 1985.

Pierson's first high-profile prime-time television role was as Jack Malloy, the head of a dysfunctional family, in The WB sitcom Unhappily Ever After, which was created by Ron Leavitt, one of the creators of FOX's Married... with Children.  Other TV roles include a leading role as R.T. Howard on That 80's Show, and recurring roles on Grace Under Fire, In Plain Sight (USA) and The Firm (NBC). He also had a recurring role as Rodney's long lost dad on the ABC comedy Rodney.

In 2005 and 2006 he appeared in two episodes of Veronica Mars as Stewart Manning, the father of Meg Manning. In 2006, he guest-starred in Criminal Minds, playing Max Ryan, a former FBI agent-turned-author and Jason Gideon's mentor who comes out of his retirement to capture a serial killer known as the Keystone Killer in the episode, "Unfinished Business". From 2006 to 2013, he portrayed Miami-Dade Police Captain Tom Matthews on the Showtime series Dexter.

He appeared in the 2008 Clint Eastwood-directed film Changeling as the flamboyant defense attorney Sammy "S.S." Hahn. In 2011 he portrayed Attorney General A. Mitchell Palmer in Eastwood's J. Edgar. He appeared in Touched by an Angel, Season 9, Episode 16.

Beginning in 2010, he had a recurring role in Boardwalk Empire as Senator Walter Edge. In 2011, Pierson played  Midas Mulligan in Atlas Shrugged, based on Ayn Rand's novel of the same name. He played Russell Dunbar's wealthy father in Rules of Engagement and he had a recurring role as the mysterious Mr. Smith on Castle. In 2014 he appeared in an episode of Suburgatory. 

In 2015 he co-starred as Defense Secretary Pierce Grey on HBO's The Brink. Recently, he stars in the former ABC and now, Netflix political thriller Designated Survivor, where he portrays Former President of the United States and Secretary of State Cornelius Moss alongside Kiefer Sutherland.

Filmography

Television filmography listed below only includes shows that Pierson appeared in three or more episodes.

References

External links

Living people
American male film actors
American male television actors
20th-century American male actors
21st-century American male actors
Year of birth missing (living people)